This is a list of New Zealand Firefighters killed in the line of duty. As of 2020, 66 firefighters have been killed, of which 23 have died while responding to an incident, 35 at incidents, and another 8 during training or routine tasks. There have been four instances of multiple fatality incidents, on 19 January 1921, 10 December 1949, 30 November 2011 and 13 February 2023.

Most of the deaths are attributed to either vehicle accidents, or physical collapse.

Firefighters

References

killed
New Zealand firefighters
Lists of people by cause of death
Lists of New Zealand people
New Zealand firefighters
History of firefighting
Firefighting in New Zealand